Marudevī was the mother of the first Jain Tirthankara, Rishabhanatha and the queen of King Nabhi.

Birth of Rishabhanatha 

The enlivening of the embryo through the descent of the future Tīrthankara's soul in the mortal body is celebrated as Garbha Kalyānaka At this time, Queen Marudevi dreamt sixteen auspicious dreams. King Nabhirāja (who was said to be endowed with clairvoyance) explained the significance of these dreams in the morning.

After these sixteen dreams she saw a large, beautiful bull entering her open mouth, indicative of a pious and extraordinary soul entering her womb.

In literature
Marudevi is mentioned in the Hindu scripture Bhagavata Purana as mother of Rishabhanatha.

See also

References

Citations

Sources
 
 
 

Jainism and women
Rishabhanatha